Xeyrimli is an abandoned Azerbaijani village in the Qazakh District of Azerbaijan. It has been under the occupation of Armenia since the First Nagorno-Karabakh War and is de facto administrated as part of its Tavush Province.

References 

Populated places in Qazax District